Sir Ronald Francis Roxburgh (19 November 1889 – 19 August 1981) was a British barrister, High Court judge, and writer on international law and on the history of the Inns of Court.

Life
Born at Eastbourne, Roxburgh was the only son of Francis Roxburgh (1850-1936) and Annie Gertrude Mortlock (1857-1948).

After graduating from Cambridge, Roxburgh was called to the bar from the Middle Temple in 1914, appointed King's Counsel in 1933, became a Justice of the Chancery Division of the High Court of Justice in 1946, knighted the same year, and retired in 1960. In his early years as a barrister he worked with the German jurist L. F. L. Oppenheim, a founder of the discipline of international law, who was Whewell Professor of International Law at Cambridge.

In 1935, Roxburgh married firstly Jane Minney, a daughter of Archibald H. and Lady Frances Gordon-Duff, herself a daughter of Hugh Fortescue, 3rd Earl Fortescue. They had one daughter, Mary Frances, born in 1936, who in 1959 married Brian Donald Boyd. Roxburgh's first wife died in 1960, and in 1966 he married secondly Dorothea Hodge.

Roxburgh died on the 19th August 1981 and is buried in a family vault on the west side of Highgate Cemetery.

Selected publications
R. F. Roxburgh, The Prisoners of War Information Bureau in London; a study, with introduction by L. Oppenheim (1915)
R. F. Roxburgh, International Conventions and Third States: a monograph (Longmans, Green and Co., 1917)
R. F. Roxburgh, "Changes in the Conception of Neutrality" in Journal of Comparative Legislation and International Law 3rd Series, Vol. 1, No. 1 (1919), pp. 17–24
R. F. Roxburgh, "The Future of International Law" in Edinburgh Review (Longmans, Green & Co. 1920)
Lassa Oppenheim, et al., ed. Ronald Francis Roxburgh, International Law: A Treatise, Vol. 1 (1920)
International Law: A Treatise, Vol. 2 War And Neutrality
Ronald Roxburgh, Origins of Lincoln's Inn (Cambridge University Press, 1963)
Sir Ronald Roxburgh, ed., The Records of the Honourable Society of Lincolns Inn: the Black Books, Volume Five, AD 1845 to AD 1914 (1968)
R. F. Roxburgh, "Rondel v. Worsley: Immunity of the Bar" Law Quarterly Review 84 (1968), p. 513
Ronald F. Roxburgh, "Lawyers in the New Temple" Law Quarterly Review 88 (1972) pp. 415–430
Ronald Roxburgh, "Two postscripts to the Black Books, Vol. V" (1977)
Ronald F. Roxburgh, "Lincoln's Inn of the Fourteenth Century" Law Quarterly Review 94 (1978) pp. 363–382

References

External links
Sir Ronald Francis Roxburgh at National Portrait Gallery

1889 births
1981 deaths
Knights Bachelor
British barristers
Chancery Division judges
People educated at Harrow School
Members of the Middle Temple
Members of Lincoln's Inn
British King's Counsel
20th-century King's Counsel
Burials at Highgate Cemetery